The 2011 AdvoCare 500 was a NASCAR Sprint Cup Series stock car race scheduled to be held on September 4, 2011, at Atlanta Motor Speedway in Hampton, Georgia, but was rescheduled to September 6, 2011 because of Tropical Storm Lee. Contested over 325 laps, it was the 25th race of the 2011 Sprint Cup Series season. Jeff Gordon's win, the 85th of his Cup Series career, gave him sole possession of the record for most Cup wins in NASCAR's "modern era" (1972–present), surpassing Darrell Waltrip. Gordon also took sole possession of third place on the all-time Cup Series wins list, ahead of Waltrip and Bobby Allison. The race was also known for being the first NASCAR race since 2007 to be run on a Tuesday.

Report

Background

Atlanta Motor Speedway is one of ten  intermediate to hold NASCAR races; the others are Charlotte Motor Speedway, Chicagoland Speedway, Darlington Raceway, Homestead Miami Speedway, Kansas Speedway, Kentucky Speedway, Las Vegas Motor Speedway, New Hampshire Motor Speedway, and Texas Motor Speedway. The track's turns are banked at twenty-four degrees, while the front stretch, the location of the finish line, and the back stretch are banked at five.

Before the race, Kyle Busch and Jimmie Johnson led the Drivers' Championship with 830 points, and Matt Kenseth stood in third with 798 points. Carl Edwards was fourth in the Drivers' Championship with 795 points, and Kevin Harvick was fifth with 782 points. Jeff Gordon, Ryan Newman, Kurt Busch, Dale Earnhardt Jr. and Tony Stewart rounded out the first ten positions. In the Manufacturers' Championship, Chevrolet was leading with 153 points, 19 points ahead of Ford. Toyota, with 133 points, was 25 points ahead of Dodge in the battle for third. Stewart was the race's defending champion.

Practice and qualifying

Two practice sessions were held before the Sunday race, one on Friday and the other on Saturday. The first session lasted 80 minutes, while the second session ran for 90 minutes. During the first practice session, Brad Keselowski was quickest, ahead of Denny Hamlin and Clint Bowyer in second and third. Martin Truex Jr. was scored fourth quickest, while Mark Martin was fifth. In the second and final practice session, Gordon was scored quickest, as Stewart and Bowyer followed in the second and third positions. Keselowski was scored in the fourth position, while Greg Biffle followed in fifth.

During qualifying, forty-seven cars were entered, but only forty-three would be able because of NASCAR's qualifying procedure. Kasey Kahne clinched his eighth career pole position, with a time of 29.775 seconds. He was joined on the front row of the grid by Bowyer. Kyle Busch qualified third, Brian Vickers took fourth, and Gordon started fifth. Kenseth, Edwards, Truex Jr., Newman, and Kurt Busch rounded out the first ten positions. The four drivers that failed to qualify for the race were T. J. Bell, David Stremme, Geoffrey Bodine, and Tony Raines.

After winning the pole position, Kahne stated, "It was definitely not a perfect lap, but it was a little better than what everyone else did. I've ran better laps than that before and not been on the pole. You never know what you're going to get, but the track is pretty slippery right now and I like it like that." He also commented, "We need to win if we want to make the Chase. Right now we're one of the ones on the outside looking in." Bowyer, who qualified second, was relieved because of his good starting position: "A good qualifying run is a breath of fresh air for all of us. We need a good run desperately." He continued, "She was loose, holy cow! It was a handful for all of us."

Race
The race, the 25th in the season, was scheduled to begin at 7:30 p.m. EDT. However, because of inclement weather from Tropical Storm Lee, NASCAR moved the start time twenty minutes earlier than the scheduled time. The race was not able to be held as expected on September 4, 2011 and was rescheduled on September 6, 2011 at 11:00 a.m. EDT. The race was televised live in the United States on ESPN.
This race was the first NASCAR race to be held on a Tuesday since 2007.

Results

Qualifying

Race results

Standings after the race

Drivers' Championship standings

Manufacturers' Championship standings

Note: Only the top five positions are included for the driver standings.

References

AdvoCare 500
AdvoCare 500
NASCAR races at Atlanta Motor Speedway
September 2011 sports events in the United States